The State Register of Heritage Places is maintained by the Heritage Council of Western Australia. , 38 places are heritage-listed in the Shire of Laverton, of which two are on the State Register of Heritage Places, the former Hotel Australia and the Mount Margaret Mission Hospital ruin.

List

State Register of Heritage Places
The Western Australian State Register of Heritage Places, lists the following state registered places within the Shire of Laverton:

Shire of Laverton heritage-listed places
The following places are heritage listed in the Shire of Laverton but are not State registered:

References

Laverton
Shire of Laverton